Land station (also: land radio station) is – according to Article 1.69 of the International Telecommunication Union´s (ITU) ITU Radio Regulations (RR) – defined as «A radio station in the mobile service not intended to be used while in motion.»

Each station shall be classified by the service in which it operates permanently or temporarily.

See also 

Selection of land stations

References / sources 

 International Telecommunication Union (ITU)

Radio stations and systems ITU